Snow Dome is a mountain in the Karakoram range near Concordia in Gilgit–Baltistan, Pakistan. It lies in the east of Chogolisa Peak (7,665 m) and in the southwest of Baltoro Kangri (7,312 m).

See also
 Baltoro Glacier
 Highest Mountains of the World

Mountains of Gilgit-Baltistan
Seven-thousanders of the Karakoram